Madan Mahatta (1932–2014) was an Indian photographer. He was mainly interested in architectural photography. He worked closely with architects including Raj Rewal, Charles Correa, Habib Rahman, and Achyut Kanvinde. Many of his works are in black-and-white. Mahatta died of cancer on 5 March 2014.

References 

1932 births
2014 deaths
20th-century Indian photographers